Maria Teresa Armengol i Bonet is an Andorran politician, the first woman democratically elected member of the General Council of Andorra in the 1985 parliamentary election. She held the office until the end of the legislature, in 1989.

References

20th-century politicians
20th-century women politicians
Andorran women in politics
Living people
Members of the General Council (Andorra)
Year of birth missing (living people)